Moy is a village and townland in County Tyrone, Northern Ireland about  southeast of Dungannon and beside the smaller village of Charlemont. Charlemont is on the east bank of the River Blackwater and Moy on the west; the two are joined by Charlemont Bridge. The river is also the boundary between County Tyrone and County Armagh. The 2011 Census recorded a population of 1,598.

History
The houses lining the village square are mostly mid-18th century, though all four churches (Roman Catholic, Church of Ireland, Presbyterian and Methodist) are later.

Moy had town commissioners under the Lighting of Towns (Ireland) Act, 1828 from 1844 until about 1865.

The Troubles
Incidents in Moy during the Troubles resulting in two or more fatalities:

1973
5 August 1973 - Francis Mullen (59) and Bernadette Mullen (39), Catholic civilians, were found shot dead by the Ulster Volunteer Force at their farmhouse, near Moy.
1975
 2 August 1975 - George McCall, civilian, Protestant, aged 22, former member of the UDR, shot dead by three masked IRA men, near his home at Jockey Lane.
23 October 1975 - Peter McKearney (63) and Jane McKearney (58), both Catholic civilians, were shot dead by the Ulster Volunteer Force at their home, Listamlet, near Moy. A contemporary newspaper article reported that "[British] Army issue ammunition" had been used. The attack has been linked to the "Glenanne gang".
1976
17 May 1976 - Robert Dobson (35) and Thomas Dobson (38), both Protestant civilians, were shot and killed by a non-specific republican group at their workplace, an egg packing factory in Dungannon Street, Moy.
1991
December 1991 - Robin Farmer (19) Protestant civilian was murdered in his father's shop by republicans. He had returned home from university for Christmas.
1992
3 January 1992 - John McKearney (69) and Kevin McKearney (32), both Catholic civilians, were shot dead by the Ulster Volunteer Force at their butcher's shop, Moy. John McKearney died on 4 April 1992. They had been targeted because two of Kevin McKearney's brothers had been killed on IRA service and another was a former IRA hunger striker, serving time for his part in the murder of a UDR soldier.
6 September 1992 - Charles Fox (63) and Teresa Fox (53), both Catholic civilians, were shot dead by the Ulster Volunteer Force at their home, Listamlet Road, near Moy. Their son, IRA volunteer Paddy Fox, was serving a 10-year prison sentence for possession of a bomb at the time.

Former railway
The Portadown – Dungannon section of the Portadown, Dungannon and Omagh Junction Railway (PD&O) opened in 1858. In 1876 the PD&O became part of the new Great Northern Railway. The Ulster Transport Authority took over the line in 1958 and closed it in 1965.

Places of interest
Dublin iron-founder Richard Turner designed a conservatory for the house c. 1850.

Sport
Moy has a long history of horse riding and Gaelic games. Moy Tir Na nOg were the 2018 All Ireland Intermediate Club Champions.

Schools
Moy Regional Primary School
St. John's Primary School, Moy

Demography
Moy is classified as a Village by the Northern Ireland Statistics and Research Agency (NISRA) (i.e. with population between 1,000 and 2,499 people). On Census Day (27 March 2011) the usually resident population of Moy Settlement was 1,598, accounting for 0.09% of the NI total. Of these:

24.72% were aged under 18 years, with 10.76% aged 65 and over
49.25% of the population were male, with 51.75% female
73.97% were from a Catholic background, with 22.03% from a 'Protestant and Other Christian (including Christian related)' background
21.59% said their nationality was British, 39.80% said their nationality was Irish and 29.04% said their nationality was Northern Irish

People
Paul Muldoon, poet, born and grew up in the Moy. He refers to it often in his poems.

References

EBook Ireland - Tyrone
County Tyrone.com
Culture Northern Ireland

Villages in County Tyrone
Civil parish of Clonfeacle
Planned communities in Northern Ireland